The 2007 Magny-Cours Superbike World Championship round was the final round of the 2007 Superbike World Championship season. It took place on the weekend of October 5–7, 2007, at the 4.411 km Magny-Cours circuit in France.

Superbike race 1 classification

Superbike race 2 classification

Supersport classification

Magny-Cours Round
Magny-Cours
Magny-Cours Superbike World Championship round